
Tamara may refer to:

People 
 Tamara (name), including a list of people with this name

 Tamara (Spanish singer) (born 1984)
 Tamara, stage name of Spanish singer Yurena (born 1969)
 Tamara, stage name of Macedonian singer Tamara Todevska (born 1985)
 Tamara or Tamar of Georgia (1160s–1213, ruled 1184–1213)
 Tamara (Hollyoaks), a fictional character in the British soap opera Hollyoaks

Artistic works 
 Tamara (2005 film), a Canadian-American horror film
 Tamara (2016 French film), a French-Belgian comedy film
Tamara (2016 Venezuelan film), a Venezuelan drama film
 Tamara (play), Canadian stage play
 Tamara (Lermontov), short poem by Mikhail Lermontov (1841) about Tamar of Georgia
 Tamara (Balakirev), symphonic poem by Mily Balakirev inspired by verse of Lermontov (1867–1882)
 , ballet by Michel Fokine and Léon Bakst to Balakirev's music (Ballets Russes, 1912)

Other 
 326 Tamara, a main belt asteroid
 Tamara passive sensor, a Czech passive sensor system
 , the yacht of Grand Duke Alexander Mikhailovich of Russia built in 1898
 Támara, Casanare, a municipality in the Colombian department of Casanare

See also
 Tamar (disambiguation)